Men's 50 metre rifle prone (then known as free rifle) was one of the fifteen shooting events at the 1996 Summer Olympics. Christian Klees shot a perfect 600 in the qualification round and set a new World record after 104.8 points (of maximum 109.0) in the final. With an even better final round, Sergey Belyayev surpassed Jozef Gönci to win the silver medal.

Qualification round

EWR Equalled World record – OR Olympic record – Q Qualified for final

Final

OR Olympic record – WR World record

References

Sources

Shooting at the 1996 Summer Olympics
Men's 050m prone 1996
Men's events at the 1996 Summer Olympics